Malmö Isstadion (Malmö Ice Stadium) is an indoor sports arena located in the Stadionområdet area of Malmö, Sweden. The capacity of the arena is 5,800 and it was built in 1968. It is the former home arena of the Malmö Redhawks ice hockey team, and was replaced as such by Malmö Arena, which was inaugurated in November 2008. In addition to sporting events, the arena was also used for concerts until the opening of the larger Malmö Arena.

History

International events, such as the 1977 IBF World Championships, Eurovision Song Contest 1992 the 1996 Davis Cup final and the 2003 European Figure Skating Championships, have been held at Malmö Isstadion.

The arena underwent major renovation in time for the 2014 World Junior Ice Hockey Championships, which Malmö Isstadion hosted alongside Malmö Arena.

Following promotion to Hockeyallsvenskan, IK Pantern moved its home arena in Kirseberg to Malmö isstadion from the 2015–2016 season.

The venue played host to the Group C matches of the 2016 European Women's Handball Championship.

See also
 Malmö Arena
 List of indoor arenas in Sweden
 List of indoor arenas in Nordic countries

References

External links

 
 
Pictures and facts (unofficial)

Sports venues in Malmö
Indoor ice hockey venues in Sweden
Handball venues in Sweden
Sports venues completed in 1968
1968 establishments in Sweden
1996 Davis Cup
Ice hockey in Malmö
Malmö Redhawks arenas
Ice hockey venues in the Øresund Region